The Magnificent Brute may refer to:
 The Magnificent Brute (1921 film), directed by Robert Thornby
 The Magnificent Brute (1936 film), directed by John G. Blystone